This is a list of notable ecologists.

A-D

 John Aber (USA)
 Aziz Ab'Saber (Brazil)
 Charles Christopher Adams (USA)
 Warder Clyde Allee (USA)
 Herbert G. Andrewartha (Australia)
 Sarah Martha Baker (UK)
 Fakhri A. Bazzaz (USA)
 John Beard (UK)
 William Dwight Billings (USA)
 Louis Charles Birch (Australia)
 Murray Bookchin (USA)
 George Bornemissza (Australia)
 Emma Lucy Braun (USA)
 James Brown (USA)
 Murray Fife Buell (USA)
 Arthur Cain (USA)
 Archie Fairly Carr (USA)
 Rachel Carson (USA)
 Jeannine Cavender-Bares (USA)
 F. Stuart Chapin III (USA)
 Eric Charnov (USA)
 Liz Chicaje (Peru)
 Frederic Clements (USA)
 Barry Commoner (USA)
 Henry Shoemaker Conard (USA)
 Joseph H. Connell (USA)
 William Skinner Cooper (USA)
 Charles F. Cooper (USA)
 Henry Chandler Cowles (USA)
 John T. Curtis (USA)
 Pierre Dansereau (Canada)
 Frank Fraser Darling (UK)
 Charles Darwin (England)
 Aparajita Datta (India)
 Margaret Bryan Davis (USA)
 Edward Smith Deevey, Jr. (USA)
 Vojislav D. Dević (Serbia)
 Rene Dubos (USA)

E-H

 Frank Edwin Egler (USA)
 Paul R. Ehrlich (USA)
 Thomas Eisner (USA)
 Heinz Ellenberg (Germany)
 Charles S. Elton (UK)
 Stephen Alfred Forbes (USA)
 Marie-Josée Fortin (Canada)
 Robin B. Foster (USA)
 Douglas Futuyma (USA)
 Jacquelyn Gill (USA)
 Henry Gleason (USA)
 Robert Fiske Griggs (USA)
 J. Philip Grime (UK)
 Peter J. Grubb (UK)
 Ernst Haeckel (Germany)
 Nelson Hairston (USA)
 Henry Paul Hansen (USA)
 Ilkka Hanski (Finland)
 Garrett Hardin (USA)
 John L. Harper (UK)
 John William Harshberger (USA)
 Jeff Harvey (USA)
 Alan Hastings (USA)
 C.S. Holling (Canada)
 Stephen P. Hubbell (USA)
 Alexander von Humboldt (Prussia/Germany)
 G. Evelyn Hutchinson (UK/USA)

I-L

 Rolf Anker Ims (Norway)
 Johs. Iversen (Denmark)
 Frances Crews James (USA)
 Daniel Janzen (USA)
 E. A. Johnson (Canada)
 Rahanna Alicia Juman (Trinidad and Tobago)
 Paul Keddy (Canada)
 Hanna Kokko (Finland)
 Charles Krebs (Canada)
 David Lack (UK)
 Hugh Lamprey (UK)
 Pierre Legendre (Canada)
 Aldo Leopold (USA)
 Estella Leopold (USA)
 Simon A. Levin (USA)
 Richard Levins (USA)
 Gene Likens (USA)
 Raymond Lindeman (USA)
 Alton A. Lindsey (USA)
 Daniel A. Livingstone (USA)
 Thomas Lovejoy (USA)
 Jane Lubchenco (USA)

M-P

 Robert MacArthur (USA)
 Georgina Mace (UK)
 Michael Marder (Spain)
 Ramon Margalef (Spain)
 Robert May (Australia/UK)
 James B. McGraw (USA)
 Samuel Joseph McNaughton (USA)
 Ian McTaggart-Cowan (Canada)
 Antônia Melo (Brazil)
 Peter Menkhorst (Australia)
 John P. Milton (USA)
 Karl Möbius (Germany)
 Harold A. Mooney (USA)
 Ann Haven Morgan (USA)
 Timothy Morton (USA)
 Sergio Rossetti Morosini (Brazil-USA)
 Cornelius Muller (USA)
 William W. Murdoch (USA)
 Robert J. Naiman (USA)
 Howard Nelson (Trinidad and Tobago)
 Eugene Odum (USA)
 Howard Odum (USA)
 Henry J. Oosting (USA)
 Gordon Howell Orians (USA)
 Richard S. Ostfeld (USA)
 Jennifer Owen (UK)
 Ruth Patrick (USA)
 Stephanie Peay (UK)
 Carlos A. Peres (Brazil)
 Javier Perez-Capdevila (Cuba)
 E. C. Pielou (Canada)
 Frank Alois Pitelka (USA)
 Henry de Puyjalon (Canada)

Q-T

 Elsie Quarterman (USA)
 T. A. Rabotnov (Russia/Soviet Union)
 Leonty Ramensky (Russia/Soviet Union)
 Derek Ratcliffe (UK)
 Christen Raunkiær (Denmark)
 Alfred Clarence Redfield (USA)
 Edward Ricketts (USA)
 Robert Ricklefs (USA)
 Edith A. Roberts (USA)
 Michael Rosenzweig (USA)
 Joan Roughgarden (USA)
 Edward James Salisbury (UK)
 José Sarukhán (Mexico)
 David Schindler (Canada)
 William H. Schlesinger (USA)
 Karl Patterson Schmidt (USA)
 Thomas W. Schoener (USA)
 Paul Sears (USA)
 Homer Leroy Shantz (USA)
 Victor Ernest Shelford (USA)
 Daniel Simberloff (USA)
 Lawrence B. Slobodkin (USA)
 Ian Stirling (Canada)
 George Sugihara (USA)
 Raman Sukumar (India)
 Arthur Tansley (UK)
 John Terborgh (USA)
 G. David Tilman (USA)
 Donald Ward Tinkle (USA)
 C. Richard Tracy (USA)
 Göte Turesson (Sweden)
 Monica Turner (USA)

U-Z

 Robert Ulanowicz (USA)
 Peter Vitousek (USA)
 Eugenius Warming (Denmark)
 Alexander Watt (UK)
 John Ernest Weaver (USA)
 Franklin White (Canada)
 Robert Whittaker (USA)
 George C. Williams (USA)
 Edward Osborne Wilson (USA)
 Sergei Winogradsky (Russia)
 Christian Wissel (Germany)
 Albert Hazen Wright (USA)
 Joy Zedler (USA)

See also
List of climate scientists
List of women climate scientists and activists

References

Ecologists